Orsenigo is a comune (municipality) in the Province of Como in the Italian region Lombardy, located about  north of Milan and about  southeast of Como.

Orsenigo borders the following municipalities: Albavilla, Albese con Cassano, Alserio, Alzate Brianza, Anzano del Parco, Cantù, Capiago Intimiano, Montorfano.

References

External links
 

Cities and towns in Lombardy